George William Smith (1762December 26, 1811) was a Virginia lawyer and politician who served several terms in the Virginia House of Delegates and was twice the acting governor of the state before then being elected as the 17th Governor of Virginia. His term as elected governor was short and ended with his death in the Richmond Theatre fire of 1811.

Early life
George William Smith was born in 1762 at the family estate "Bathurst" in Essex County, Virginia, to Alice and Meriwether Smith.  His father was a notable Virginia politician, having served in the House of Burgesses, the Continental Congress and the Virginia House of Delegates. His mother (maiden name "Lee") was a great grandchild of Richard Lee I ("The Immigrant"). George Williams Smith took up the practice of law and was married twice. His first marriage to Sarah Adams in 1793 produced children, though his second marriage to Jane Reade Jones did not.

Political career
Like his father, the younger Smith soon entered politics, first representing Essex County in the Virginia House of Delegates before taking his law practice to the city of Richmond. He again won election to the Virginia House from 1802 to 1808, this time representing Richmond.  He was appointed to the Virginia Council of State Council and soon became its senior member and thus the Lieutenant Governor of Virginia.

As the senior member of the Virginia Council, Smith became the acting Governor of Virginia, between the terms of John Tyler Sr. and James Monroe, for five days in January 1811.  He became acting Governor again, from April to December of the same year, when Monroe resigned to become United States Secretary of State. Smith was then elected to the office in his own right as the 17th Governor of Virginia, representing the Democratic-Republican Party.  However, his official tenure lasted only three weeks before his death during the great Richmond Theatre fire of December 26, 1811.  Governor Smith had initially reached safety, but he went back into the fire and died trying to find his young son.  The Governor's sudden and unexpected death left the Virginia executive branch in turmoil, prompting acting Governor Peyton Randolph to push the legislature to appoint a successor swiftly.

Smith's ashes were placed under a rock at Monumental Church in Richmond with the ashes of other victims of the fire, including former senator and president of the Bank of Virginia, Abraham B. Venable.

References

External links

George William Smith at the National Governor's Association
Archival Records
A Guide to the Governor George William Smith Executive Papers, 1811–1812 at The Library of Virginia

1762 births
1811 deaths
Governors of Virginia
People from Essex County, Virginia
Members of the Virginia House of Delegates
Virginia Democratic-Republicans
Accidental deaths in Virginia
Deaths from fire in the United States
Democratic-Republican Party state governors of the United States
19th-century American politicians
19th-century American Episcopalians